Charles Turner (13 June 1803 – 15 October 1875) was a British businessman and Conservative politician.

He was the son of Ralph Turner, a trader from Hull, Yorkshire. He entered business in Liverpool as an East India Company merchant. He subsequently became chairman of the British Shipowners Company and of the Royal Insurance Company, and a director of the Great Northern Railway. From 1851 – 1861 he was chairman of the Mersey Docks and Harbour Board. He was appointed as a justice of the peace for the County Palatine of Lancaster and Borough of Liverpool, and was a  deputy lieutenant for the county.

Politically, Turner was a Conservative, and in July 1852 was elected one of Liverpool's two members of parliament, along with William Forbes Mackenzie. However, the two defeated Liberal candidates issued an election petition contesting the results. In the ensuing court proceedings the two men's election agents were found to have been guilty of bribery and treating. On 21 June 1853 the election of Turner and Mackenzie was declared void. Turner was again chosen as a Conservative candidate for Liverpool at the next general election in 1857, but was unsuccessful.

Turner was to return to the Commons in 1861. In that year the representation of the existing constituency of South Lancashire was increased from two to three members of parliament. Turner was nominated to contest the seat for the Conservatives. In his nomination speech, he set out his opposition to the separation of church and state and to elections by secret ballot. The by-election was held on 17 August and Turner defeated his Liberal opponent by a majority of 834 votes. He held the seat at the next general election in 1865.

The Reform Act 1867 abolished the South Lancashire constituency. When the next general election was held in 1868, Turner was elected as one of two members for the new seat of South West Lancashire, holding it in 1874. He remained an MP until his death.

In 1843 Turner married Anne Whitaker of Melton, Yorkshire, and they had one son. In 1875, he became unwell, and it was widely expected that he would retire from parliament. Before he could do so he died at his residence in Dingle, Liverpool aged 72.

References

External links 

1803 births
1875 deaths
Conservative Party (UK) MPs for English constituencies
UK MPs 1852–1857
UK MPs 1859–1865
UK MPs 1865–1868
UK MPs 1868–1874
UK MPs 1874–1880
British businesspeople in shipping
Deputy Lieutenants of Lancashire
Members of the Parliament of the United Kingdom for Liverpool
19th-century British businesspeople